Jim Tew (born October 29, 1944) is an American rower. He competed in the men's coxed four event at the 1964 Summer Olympics. He graduated from Harvard University.

References

1944 births
Living people
American male rowers
Olympic rowers of the United States
Rowers at the 1964 Summer Olympics
Sportspeople from New York City
Harvard Crimson rowers